Jordan White (born June 4, 1988) is a former American football wide receiver. He was drafted by the New York Jets in the seventh round of the 2012 NFL Draft. He played college football at Western Michigan University. As a senior in 2011 at Western Michigan, he led all players in the NCAA Football Bowl Subdivision in total receiving yards (1,911), total receptions (140), receiving yards per game (147.0) and receptions per game (10.77).

Early years
White finished his high school career at North Ridgeville High School in North Ridgeville, Ohio with career marks of 51 receptions for 646 yards, 21 carries for 352 yards, 15 total touchdowns, and a 38.9 yards per punt average.  He was named first-team All-Lorain County both his junior and senior year, as well as an honorable mention for the all-state team.

College career

2007 season
After redshirting during the 2006 season, White appeared in nine games for the Broncos.  He made his first reception against West Virginia University, and his first career touchdown against Ball State.

2009 season
After missing the 2008 season due to injury, White finished the 2009 season with four 100-yard receiving games, and earned his first spot on the post-season All-MAC Awards (Third-team).

2010 season
2010 was White's break out year.  The Sports Illustrate Honorable Mention All American led the team in receiving yardage (1,378 total yards), as well as took over punt return duties for the Broncos.  The 1,378 yards receiving broke the single-season school record set two years prior by Jamarko Simmons.  White was named to All-MAC First-team, along with fellow Bronco receiver, Juan Nunez, and a Fred Biletnikoff Award semi-finalist for the best college football receiver in the nation.

2011 season
White was given a sixth year of eligibility by the NCAA to return to Western Michigan due to his injuries during the 2008 season.  On November 8, 2011, he caught a career-high 16 passes for 238 yards against Toledo.  During the 2011 regular season, White had 127 receptions for 1,646 yards, ranking first among NCAA Division I FBS players in both categories.  He also led the FBS with averages of 10.57 receptions per game and 137.17 receiving yards per game.

White was named as a Biletnikoff Award semi-finalist for the second consecutive season. He also received All-Conference First-team honors for the second consecutive season. He was also named Walter Camp Football Foundation Second-team All American and American Football Coaches Association All American. On December 15, Jordan White was named Associated Press All-American. By receiving this honor, Jordan White became the first "consensus" All-American in school history at Western Michigan University.

Professional career

2012 NFL Draft

New York Jets
The New York Jets drafted White using their seventh round selection in the 2012 NFL Draft. White suffered a fractured bone in his left foot on May 21, 2012 and surgery was subsequently performed two days later. White signed a four-year $2.145 million contract on June 14, 2012. He was waived on August 31, 2012. White was signed to the practice squad a day later.

White was released from the squad on September 28, 2012. He was re-signed to the practice squad on October 2, 2012. He was promoted to the active roster on November 22, 2012. White was released on August 4, 2013.

Career statistics

Western Michigan
Receiving

* Led NCAA Division I

See also
 List of NCAA major college football yearly receiving leaders

References

External links
Western Michigan Broncos bio
New York Jets bio

1988 births
Living people
American football wide receivers
New York Jets players
People from Middleburg Heights, Ohio
Players of American football from Ohio
Sportspeople from Cuyahoga County, Ohio
Western Michigan Broncos football players